The Alcázar de Colón, or Columbus Alcazar is the first fortified European palace built in the Americas. It is located in the Dominican Republic's colonial area of Santo Domingo city, and forms part of the Ciudad Colonial UNESCO's World Heritage Site. It was built between 1510 and 1514 mostly in a Gothic and Renaissance style.

It is the only known residence of a member of the Christopher Columbus family in the New World, his first-born son Diego Columbus, whose children Juana, Isabel, Luis and Christopher were born in the palace. Diego Columbus died in Spain in 1526 but María Álvarez de Toledo, his widow, remained there until her death in 1549. Three generations of the Columbus family inhabited the residence, possibly until the late 16th century. 

The Tapestry collection (spanning from the 15th to 17th centuries) is particularly important and unique in the Caribbean, and includes pieces produced by the Flemish Van Den Hecke family from cartouches created by Charles Le Brun. The Alcázar is the most visited museum in Santo Domingo.

History
The Alcázar de Colón was built between 1510 and 1514, in year 1509 Columbus himself bacame governor and viceroy of the colony, it was built following the influences of the existing one in Mancera de Abajo, in Salamanca (Spain), of which ruins are still preserved. The name of the architect who carried out the construction of this fortified palace is unknown. Mainly Gothic in style, it also has some Renaissance characteristics, notable in its arcades.

Some of the most famous Spanish conquistadors such as Hernán Cortés and Pedro de Alvarado visited the residence. During the early Spanish colonial period, the mansion occupied a very important place in history. It was from here that many expeditions of conquest and exploration were planned. In 1586, the palace was captured and looted by the British pirate Sir Francis Drake and his forces who took many valuables with them. The ownership of the palace was the subject of litigation for nearly two centuries from that year.

It is the only known residence of a member of the Columbus family, apart from Christopher's birthplace, which is still in Genoa. Juana, Isabel, Luis and Cristóbal Columbus de Toledo, children of Don Diego Columbus and his wife Doña María Álvarez de Toledo, were born in the palace. Diego Columbus died in Spain in 1526 but María Álvarez de Toledo, his widow, remained there until her death in 1549. Three generations of the Columbus de Toledo family inhabited it, possibly until 1577.

As the influence of Santo Domingo declined, the house fell into deterioration, and by the mid-18th century was abandoned and in danger of rotting away. Originally the residence had 55 rooms, of which only 22 remain. Eventually it was abandoned and the passage of time began to wreak havoc on the structure of the palace. By 1776 the building start to fell into a bad condition and was nearly turned it into a prison, a project that was not carried out. 

Almost a century later in 1870 it was declared a National Monument and the Dominican government eventually restored the palace. It was restored between 1955 and 1957, being transformed into a 22 rooms museum filled with period furniture, artwork, and other accessories.  A self-guided tour using a portable audio speaker that discusses each room's function is available in various languages.

Architecture
The building was constructed using masonry made of coral rocks. It was built on a plot close to the rock islet that look towards the Ozama River, granted to Diego Columbus, firstborn son of the discoverer of the Americas, Christopher Columbus, by King Ferdinand II of Aragon, to build a dwelling for him and his descendants on the island Hispaniola, to which he arrived in 1509 as governor. The building houses the Museo Alcázar de Diego Colón, whose collection exhibits the Caribbean's most important ensemble of European late medieval and Renaissance works of art, which were acquired in the 1950s.

The palace is an impressive construction of coralline blocks that once housed some fifty rooms and a number of gardens and courtyards, although what remains today is about half the size it once was. It was built under Diego Colón, the son of Christopher Columbus; when he became the 4th Governor of the Indies in 1509, he ordered the construction of a family home and governor’s mansion between 1510 and 1512. The architectural style is gothic typical of the early 16th century.

Gallery

Exterior

Interior

See also
List of colonial buildings in Santo Domingo
Captaincy General of Santo Domingo
Ciudad Colonial (Santo Domingo)
History of the Dominican Republic

References

External links

Official Alcázar de Colón museum website

Buildings and structures in Santo Domingo
Museums in the Dominican Republic
Columbus family
Spanish Colonial architecture in the Dominican Republic
Tourist attractions in Santo Domingo
Ciudad Colonial (Santo Domingo)